An autonomy referendum was held in Tarija Department in Bolivia on 22 June 2008, following the autonomy referendum held in Santa Cruz Department on 4 May 2008 and the autonomy referendums held in Beni Department and Pando Department on 1 June 2008.

The referendum was approved with over 80% in favour, though most supporters of President Morales did not vote.

References

2008 elections in South America
2008 in Bolivia
2008 referendums
Autonomy referendums
Referendums in Bolivia
Regionalism (politics)
June 2008 events in South America